The Milwaukee Film Festival is a public film festival held each spring from April 20th through May 4th in Milwaukee, Wisconsin. The festival is organized by Milwaukee Film, a cultural arts organization that operates Milwaukee's historic movie palace, The Oriental Theatre, and facilitates year-long programming and initiatives using film to inspire community, artistry, education, and joy. 

In 2015, 304 films from more than 50 countries were screened at five Milwaukee County venues, with nearly 71,000 attendees. 

Founded in 2009, after the Milwaukee International Film Festival was discontinued, the Milwaukee Film Festival is the fifth largest film festival in the United States in terms of attendance, the number of films screened and festival length.

Theaters 
Avalon Atmospheric Theater & Lounge - Bay View, Milwaukee, Wisconsin
Jan Serr Studio Cinema - East Side, Milwaukee, Wisconsin
Oriental Theatre - East Side, Milwaukee, Wisconsin
Times Cinema - Washington Heights, Milwaukee, Wisconsin

Past Venues
Downer Theatre - East Side, Milwaukee, Wisconsin
Fox Bay Cinema Grill - Whitefish Bay, Milwaukee, Wisconsin

See also 
 List of film festivals

References

Festivals in Milwaukee
Tourist attractions in Milwaukee
Film festivals in Wisconsin
Film festivals established in 2009
2009 establishments in Wisconsin